Trond Fredrik Ludvigsen (born 22 June 1982 in Alta) is a Norwegian footballer.

He debuted in the Norwegian Premier League for Bodø/Glimt at the age of 16 years and 314 days, and as such he is one of the youngest players to appear in this league. Good performances in Bodø earned him a transfer to Hertha BSC, but he was unsuccessful and returned to Norway. In 2005, he was bought by SK Brann. Ludvigsen has been troubled with injury since arriving in Bergen, and has not played many matches. He found it hard to gain a regular spot in Brann and was loaned out to Strømsgodset IF in July 2007. In December 2008 he signed for Bodø/Glimt for the third time. In 2011, he returned to Alta.

Career statistics

References

Norwegian footballers
Alta IF players
FK Bodø/Glimt players
Hertha BSC players
Hertha BSC II players
Bundesliga players
Expatriate footballers in Germany
SK Brann players
Rosenborg BK players
Strømsgodset Toppfotball players
People from Alta, Norway
1982 births
Living people
Norwegian expatriate footballers
Eliteserien players
Association football midfielders
Association football forwards
Sportspeople from Troms og Finnmark